A Very Special Christmas: 25 Years Bringing Joy to the World is the eighth in the A Very Special Christmas series of Christmas music-themed compilation albums produced to benefit the Special Olympics. The album was released on October 16, 2012. It peaked at #61 on December 2012 Billboard album chart.

Track listing

External links
A Very Special Christmas 25th Anniversary at A Very Special Christmas Official Website
A Very Special Christmas Official Website
A Very Special Christmas 25th Anniversary at Amazon.com

2012 Christmas albums
2012 compilation albums
A Very Special Christmas
Big Machine Records compilation albums

pl:A Very Special Christmas 2